Jean-Marc Bideau (born 8 April 1984) is a French former racing cyclist, who rode professionally between 2007 and 2016 for the ,  and  teams. He rode in the 2014 Tour de France, finishing 115th in his only Grand Tour start.

Major results

2007
 5th Overall Grand Prix Chantal Biya
2008
 8th Grand Prix de la ville de Pérenchies
 10th Classic Loire Atlantique
2009
 1st Stage 3 Kreiz Breizh Elites
 3rd Grand Prix de la Ville de Lillers
2010
 2nd Grand Prix de la Ville de Lillers
 2nd Paris–Troyes
 4th Classic Loire Atlantique
 10th Paris–Camembert
2011
 3rd Paris–Mantes-en-Yvelines
 6th Overall Tour de Normandie
1st Stage 5
2012
 1st Paris–Troyes
 3rd Paris–Camembert
 3rd Tour du Doubs
 9th Overall Tour de Normandie
1st Stage 6
 9th Overall Mi-Août en Bretagne
2013
 1st Paris–Troyes
2014
 5th Boucles de l'Aulne
 9th Grand Prix de Plumelec-Morbihan

References

External links
 

1984 births
Living people
French male cyclists
People from Quimperlé
Sportspeople from Finistère
Cyclists from Brittany